York City Football Club is a professional association football club based in York, North Yorkshire, England. The club was founded in 1922 and was elected to the Midland League, which the team played in until 1929 when they were elected to the Football League. The highest level of the English football league system the team has reached is the second tier, spending two seasons in the Second Division during the 1970s. The club lost its Football League status following relegation to the Football Conference in 2004, but regained it eight years later with victory in the 2012 Conference Premier play-off Final.

This list encompasses the major honours won by York City, and records set by the club, its players and its managers. The player records section itemises the club's leading goalscorers and those who have made most appearances in first-team competitions. It also records notable achievements by York players on the international stage, and the highest transfer fees paid and received by the club. Attendance records at Fulfordgate, Bootham Crescent and the York Community Stadium are also included.

All figures are correct as of the match played on 21 May 2022, the final match of York's 2021–22 season.

Honours

York City have won one major honour in the Football League, when winning the 1983–84 Fourth Division championship. With 101 points, York became the first club in the Football League to reach a three-figure points total. They have achieved promotion on seven other occasions, most recently in the 2021–22 season, when winning the National League North play-offs. York won their first domestic cup competition in the 2011–12 season, beating Newport County in the 2012 FA Trophy Final.

York's honours and achievements include the following:

The Football League
Third Division (level 3)
Promotion: 1973–74
Fourth Division / Third Division (level 4)
Champions: 1983–84
Promotion: 1958–59, 1964–65, 1970–71, 1992–93

Football Conference/National League
Conference Premier (level 5)
Promotion: 2011–12

National League North (level 6)
Promotion: 2021–22

Domestic cup competition
FA Trophy
Winners: 2011–12, 2016–17
Finalists: 2008–09

Player records

Appearances
Youngest first-team player: Reg Stockill, 15 years 281 days (against Wigan Borough, Third Division North, 29 August 1929).
Oldest first-team player: Paul Musselwhite, 43 years 127 days (against Forest Green Rovers, Conference Premier, 28 April 2012).

Most appearances
Competitive matches only, appearances as substitute in brackets.

Goalscorers
Most goals in a season: 56, by Jimmy Cowie in 1928–29.
Most league goals in a season: 49, by Jimmy Cowie in the Midland League, 1928–29.
Most goals in a match:
6, by Jimmy Cowie against Stockton, FA Cup, 29 September 1928.
6, by Jimmy Cowie against Worksop Town, Midland League, 23 February 1929.

Top goalscorers
Competitive matches only. Matches played (including as substitute) appear in brackets.

International caps

This section refers only to caps earned while a York player.
First capped player: Eamon Dunphy, for the Republic of Ireland against Spain on 10 November 1965.
First international goalscorer: Anthony Straker, for Grenada against Haiti on 4 September 2015.
Most capped player: Peter Scott with 7 caps for Northern Ireland as a York player.

Transfers
Where a transfer in the record transfer fees tables below involved an initial fee potentially rising to a higher figure depending on contractual clauses being satisfied in the future, the initial fee is listed in the tables beside a footnote detailing any additional payments.

Record transfer fees paid

Record transfer fees received

Managerial records

First manager: Jock Collier managed the club for two seasons, which included 105 matches, from July 1928 to May 1930.
Longest serving manager by time: Tom Mitchell managed the club for 12 years and 11 months, which included 270 matches, from March 1937 to February 1950.
Longest serving manager by matches: Tom Lockie managed the club for 376 matches over a period of seven years and three months, from July 1960 to October 1967.

Club records

Goals
Most league goals scored in a season: 96 in 46 matches, Fourth Division, 1983–84.
Fewest league goals scored in a season: 35 in 46 matches, Third Division, 2003–04.
Most league goals conceded in a season: 106 in 46 matches, Third Division, 1965–66.
Fewest league goals conceded in a season: 35 in 44 matches, Conference Premier, 2009–10.

Points
Most points in a season:
Two points for a win: 62 in 46 matches, Fourth Division, 1964–65.
Three points for a win: 101 in 46 matches, Fourth Division, 1983–84.
Fewest points in a season:
Two points for a win: 27 in 46 matches, Third Division, 1965–66.
Three points for a win: 33 in 46 matches, Third Division, 1987–88.

Matches

Firsts
First Midland League match: Notts County Reserves 4–2 York City, 6 September 1922.
First match at Fulfordgate: York City 4–1 Mansfield Town, Midland League, 20 September 1922.
First FA Cup match: York City 2–1 Castleford & Allerton United, extra preliminary round, 8 September 1923.
First Football League match: Wigan Borough 0–2 York City, Third Division North, 31 August 1929.
First match at Bootham Crescent: York City 2–2 Stockport County, Third Division North, 31 August 1932.
First Football League Third Division North Cup match: York City 2–1 Hartlepools United, first round, 13 January 1934.
First League Cup match: York City 1–2 Blackburn Rovers, first round, 10 October 1960.
First Associate Members' Cup/Football League Trophy match: York City 1–2 Hull City, first round north, 21 February 1984.
First Football Conference match: Aldershot Town 2–0 York City, 14 August 2004.
First FA Trophy match: Burton Albion 3–0 York City, third round, 15 January 2005.
First Conference Cup/Conference League Cup match: Accrington Stanley 2–1 York City, third round north, 25 January 2005.
First match at York Community Stadium: York City 1–3 AFC Fylde, National League North, 16 February 2021.

Record wins
Record league win: York City 9–1 Southport, Third Division North, 2 February 1957.
Record FA Cup win:
York City 7–1 Horsforth, preliminary round, 20 September 1924.
York City 7–1 Stockton Malleable, third qualifying round, 29 October 1927.
York City 7–1 Stockton, first qualifying round, 29 September 1928.
South Shields 0–6 York City, first round, 16 November 1968.
York City 6–0 Rushall Olympic, fourth qualifying round, 27 October 2007.
Record League Cup win: York City 5–0 Doncaster Rovers, first round second leg, 4 September 1984.

Record defeats
Record league defeat: Chester 12–0 York City, Third Division North, 1 February 1936.
Record FA Cup defeat: Liverpool 7–0 York City, fifth round replay, 20 February 1985.
Record League Cup defeat: York City 1–5 Stoke City, first round first leg, 22 August 2000.

Record consecutive results
This section applies to league matches only.
Record consecutive wins: 8, from 14 November 2009 to 23 January 2010, Conference Premier.
Record consecutive draws:
6, from 26 December 1992 to 22 January 1993, Third Division.
6, from 3 May 2014 to 30 August 2014, League Two.
Record consecutive defeats: 8, from 14 November 1966 to 31 December 1966, Fourth Division.
Record consecutive matches without a defeat: 23, from 1 February 2014 to 6 September 2014, League Two.
Record consecutive matches without a draw: 22, from 11 January 1969 to 2 May 1969, Fourth Division.
Record consecutive matches without a win: 21, 17 January 2004 to 14 August 2004, Third Division and Conference National.

Attendances

Highest attendance at a home match:
Fulfordgate: 12,721, against Sheffield United, FA Cup third round replay, 14 January 1931.
Bootham Crescent: 28,123, against Huddersfield Town, FA Cup sixth round, 5 March 1938.
York Community Stadium: 7,448, against Boston United, National League North play-off final, 21 May 2022.
Lowest attendance at a home match:
Fulfordgate: 1,500, against Maltby Main, FA Cup preliminary round, 23 September 1925.
Bootham Crescent: 608, against Mansfield Town, Conference League Cup third round, 4 November 2008.
York Community Stadium: 1,184, against Blyth Spartans, FA Trophy second round, 27 November 2021.
Highest seasonal average league attendance: 10,412, Third Division North, 1948–49.
Lowest seasonal average league attendance: 2,139, Fourth Division, 1977–78.

Notes

References

Records
York City
York City F.C. records